Alena Mihulová (born 4 May 1965) is a Czech film and television actress.  She won Czech Lion for her role in Home Care. She was married to film director Karel Kachyňa.

Selected filmography
Sestřičky (1983)
Smrt krásných srnců (1986)
Kráva (1992)
Wild Flowers (2000)
Lidice (2011)
Innocence (2011)
Home Care (2015)
Anthropoid (2016)
The Zookeeper's Wife (2017)
Milada (2017)

External links

1965 births
Czech television actresses
Czech film actresses
Actors from Brno
21st-century Czech actresses
20th-century Czech actresses
Living people
Czech Lion Awards winners
Janáček Academy of Music and Performing Arts alumni